Malek Al-Yasseri is a Jordanian footballer who plays for Al-Hussein.

References

External links
 
 jo.gitsport.net

1985 births
Living people
Jordanian footballers
Association football defenders
Al-Hussein SC (Irbid) players
Al-Jazeera (Jordan) players
Kufrsoum SC players
Al-Ramtha SC players
Mansheyat Bani Hasan players